Shiblun railway station is a halt railway station on the Howrah–Azimganj line of Howrah railway division of Eastern Railway zone. It is situated beside Kandi–Katwa Road at Ambalgram, Shiblun, Purba Bardhaman in the Indian state of West Bengal. It serves Ketugram II block and surrounding areas.

History
In 1913, the Hooghly–Katwa Railway constructed a  broad gauge line from Bandel to Katwa, and the Barharwa–Azimganj–Katwa Railway constructed the  broad gauge Barharwa–Azimganj–Katwa loop. With the construction of the Farakka Barrage and opening of the railway bridge in 1971, the railway communication picture of this line were completely changed. Total 23 trains including few Passengers trains and EMU stop at Shiblun. The distance between Howrah and Shiblun railway station is approximately 152 km.

References

Railway stations in Purba Bardhaman district
Howrah railway division